William Aldrich Tateum (August 31 1862 – May 15, 1957) was a Republican member of the Michigan House of Representatives from 1893 through 1894. For his one term, he served as Speaker of the House, during the 37th Legislature.

Early years 
Born in Worcester County, Massachusetts in 1862, Tateum graduated from Wesleyan University in Connecticut.

Career 
He was admitted to the Massachusetts bar before moving to Michigan. Tateum was elected to the Grand Rapids City Council (then called the board of aldermen) in 1891 before his election to the House in 1892.

Death 
Tateum died on May 15, 1957, aged 94.

References

1859 births
1957 deaths
People from Worcester County, Massachusetts
Politicians from Grand Rapids, Michigan
Wesleyan University alumni
Massachusetts lawyers
Michigan lawyers
Michigan city council members
Members of the Michigan House of Representatives
Speakers of the Michigan House of Representatives